Alejandro Ulloa (22 October 1910 – 27 April 2004) was a Spanish actor.

He was born in Madrid on 22 October 1910. He owned a theater company and in 1943, while working as a voice actor, he was the director of Metro Goldwin Mayer in Barcelona. His role debut was El Tenorio by José Zorrilla at Teatro Romea.

He lived in Barcelona until the Spanish Civil War, when he moved to America with his company and Paquita Ferrándiz. When he came back to Spain he appeared in the Spaghetti Western Abre tu fosa, amigo... llega Sábata (1971), by Ignacio F. Iquino. He also appeared in Es peligroso asomarse al exterior and he was the cinematographer of Las chicas de la Cruz Roja,  El día de los enamorados and Las de Caín.

He died on 27 April 2004 in Hospital de Barcelona after being bedridden for seven months due to a fall.

References

1910 births
2004 deaths
Spanish male stage actors
Spanish male television actors
Male actors from Madrid
Spanish male voice actors
Accidental deaths from falls
20th-century Spanish male actors